La nieta elegida (English: The Chosen Granddaughter) is a Colombian telenovela created by Julio Jiménez and Iván Martínez for RCN Televisión. It aired on Canal RCN from 27 September 2021 to 1 February 2022. The series stars Francisca Estévez, Carlos Torres, Juliette Pardau, and Consuelo Luzardo. Production began on 8 April 2021.

Plot 
Luisa (Francisca Estévez) is a young woman who, by order of her father, will be in an unknown world in order to take revenge on the Roldán family, but soon the affection that Sara (Consuelo Luzardo), her supposed grandmother, will give her and meeting Juan Esteban Osorno (Carlos Torres), the boyfriend of another of Sara's granddaughters, will cause Luisa to enter into a dilemma.

Cast 
 Consuelo Luzardo as Sara Roldán
 Francisca Estévez as Luisa Mayorga
 Carlos Torres as Juan Esteban "Juanes" Osorno
 Kepa Amuchastegui as Augusto Roldán
 Juan Pablo Gamboa as Nicolás Roldán
 Geraldine Zivic as María Consuelo Roldán
 Adriana Arango as Rosa Espinosa
 Marcela Benjumea as Esther
 Juliette Pardau as Vivian Roldán
 Sebastián Osorio as Milán Mayorga
 Stephania Duque as Laura Roldán
 Carlos Báez as Adrián Alvarado 
 María José Camacho as Paola Alvarado
 Gregorio Urquijo as Lucas Alvarado
 Ricardo Vesga as Florentino Espartero
 Nayra Castillo as Lucrecia Villamil
 Mariam Castañeda as Elvira Loaiza
 Ana María Arango as Perpetua Bautista
 Marie Villarreal as Helena Hidalgo
 Silvia De Dios as Daniela Krogemann
 Patrick Delmas as Germán Osorno
 Claudio Cataño as Sergio Roldán
 Sebastián Boscán
 Héctor García as Braulio Mayorga
 Margalida Castro as Érika Bruner
 Cristina Campuzano as Olivia
 Orlando Valenzuela as Roberto Alvarado
 Alejandra Villafañe as Diana Cañedo

Episodes

Reception

Ratings

Awards and nominations

References

External links 
 

2021 telenovelas
2021 Colombian television series debuts
2022 Colombian television series endings
Colombian telenovelas
RCN Televisión telenovelas
Spanish-language telenovelas